Schelluinen is a village in the Dutch province of South Holland. It is a part of the municipality of Molenlanden, and lies about 4 km west of Gorinchem.

In 2017, the village of Schelluinen had 1,426 inhabitants. The built-up area of the village was 0.23 km², and contained 342 residences.
The statistical area "Schelluinen", which also can include the peripheral parts of the village, as well as the surrounding countryside, has a population of around 1240.

Schelluinen was a separate municipality between 1817 and 1986, when it became part of Giessenlanden, which in 2019 merged into Molenlanden.

General 
Schelluinen lies near the N216 and has a public elementary school called Het Tweespan. Furthermore, the village has a playground, petting zoo, tennis, skating and gym association. The local football club is VV Schelluinen. There is also a branch of the CBR located in the village.

References

Populated places in South Holland
Former municipalities of South Holland
Molenlanden